The 1943 Ashford by-election was held on 10 February 1943.  The by-election was held due to the appointment as Chief Justice of India of the incumbent Conservative MP, Patrick Spens.  It was won by the Conservative candidate Edward Percy Smith.

References

1943 in England
Borough of Ashford
1943 elections in the United Kingdom
By-elections to the Parliament of the United Kingdom in Kent constituencies
1940s in Kent
February 1943 events